The 2021 English Open (also known as the BetVictor English Open, for the purposes of sponsorship) was a professional ranking snooker tournament that took place from 1–7 November 2021 at the Marshall Arena in Milton Keynes, England. It was the fourth ranking event of the 2021–22 season, and the second event in both the Home Nations Series and the European Series. Qualifying for the tournament took place from 17 to 22 September 2021 at the Metrodome in Barnsley, England, although matches involving the top 16 players, and two other matches involving English wildcards, were held over and played at the Marshall Arena. The event was broadcast on Eurosport across the United Kingdom and Europe.

Judd Trump was the defending champion, having defeated Neil Robertson 9–8 in the previous year's final. Trump lost 3–5 to Mark King in the quarter-finals. Robertson faced John Higgins in the  final. Although Robertson led 5–3 after the afternoon session, Higgins won the first four frames of the evening session to lead 7–5, and then moved within one frame of victory at 8–6. However, Robertson won the last three frames to defeat Higgins 9–8 and claim the 21st ranking title of his professional career. He became the third player, after Trump and Mark Selby, to win three Home Nations titles, and the first player to win three different tournaments in the series, having previously won the Scottish Open and the Welsh Open.

Higgins sustained his second successive defeat from 8–6 ahead in a best-of-17 ranking final. He had lost the 2021 Northern Ireland Open final to Mark Allen under similar circumstances the previous month.

Prize fund
The breakdown of prize money for this year is shown below:

 Winner: £70,000
 Runner-up: £30,000
 Semi-final: £20,000
 Quarter-final: £10,000
 Last 16: £7,500
 Last 32: £4,000
 Last 64: £3,000
 Highest break: £5,000
 Total: £405,000

Main draw

Top half

Bottom half

Final

Qualifying 
Qualification for the tournament took place from 17 to 22 September 2021 at the Metrodome in Barnsley, England. Matches which involved the top 16 players and two wildcard nominations were held over and played at the Marshall Arena. Zhou Yuelong and Zhang Jiankang were withdrawn from the event due to being identified as a close contact of a positive COVID-19 case; they were replaced by Ross Muir and Bai Langning respectively. Separately, Lei Peifan withdrew and was replaced by James Cahill. Cahill won his qualifying match but then he had to withdraw due to a positive COVID-19 test. Mark Williams was also withdrawn from the event after testing positive for COVID-19 in October; he was replaced by Mark Lloyd. Teenage amateurs Paul Deaville and Oliver Sykes played in their first professional events after receiving an invite from WST.

  (1) 4–1 
  4–0 
  (32) 4–2 
  3–4 
  (16) 4–1 
  4–1 
  4–1 
  4–3 
  4–2 
  (24) 4–0 
  4–0 
  (9) 3–4  
  4–2 
  (25) 4–1 
  4–1 
  0–4 
  (5) 4–0 
  4–2 
  (28) 4–2 
  4–0 
  (12) 4–1 
  2–4 
  (21) 2–4 
  4–0 
  1–4 
  (20) 4–2 
  4–0 
  (13) 4–1 
  4–1 
  (29) 4–0 
  4–2 
  (4) 4–0 
  (3) 4–1 
  1–4 
  (30) 2–4 
  4–2 
  (14) 3–4 
  4–2 
  (19) 4–0 
  3–4 
  4–1 
  (22) 4–1 
  4–2 
  (11) 1–4 
  1–4 
  (27) 1–4 
  4–1 
  (6) 4–3 
  (7) 4–1 
  4–0 
  (26) 3–4 
  1–4 
  (10) 4–1 
  0–4 
  (23) 4–0 
  3–4 
  3–4 
  (18) 4–2 
  4–1 
  (15) 4–1 
  1–4 
  (31) 3–4 
  4–0 
  (2) 4–2

Notes

Century breaks

Main stage centuries

Total: 45

 141, 135  Chris Wakelin
 140, 126, 123, 120, 111, 106, 104, 101  Neil Robertson
 138  Shaun Murphy
 138  Zhao Xintong
 136  Mark Davis
 135, 117, 110, 102, 100  Kyren Wilson
 129, 127, 123, 120, 119, 108, 108, 103  Ronnie O'Sullivan
 128  Gary Wilson
 127  Ali Carter
 120  Xiao Guodong
 119, 104, 103  John Higgins
 115, 105  Martin Gould
 114  Tom Ford
 111, 104  Judd Trump
 111  Ben Woollaston
 109, 101  David Gilbert
 105  Chang Bingyu
 103  Jamie Clarke
 102  Mark Selby
 101  Luca Brecel
 100  Ross Muir

Qualifying stage centuries

Total: 23

 146  Barry Hawkins
 139, 123, 105  Thepchaiya Un-Nooh
 135  John Higgins
 129  Kyren Wilson
 126  Ricky Walden
 125  Cao Yupeng
 113  Mark Joyce
 113  Mark Selby
 111  Chang Bingyu
 111  Alexander Ursenbacher
 109  Anthony McGill
 109  Judd Trump
 108  Jimmy Robertson
 107  David Gilbert
 106  Tom Ford
 106  Chris Wakelin
 104  Stuart Carrington
 104  Anthony Hamilton
 101  Robbie Williams
 101  Gary Wilson
 100  Ronnie O'Sullivan

References 

2021
2021 in English sport
English Open
English Open
Home Nations Series
European Series
Sport in Milton Keynes